Malope trifida (mallow-wort, annual malope, maloppi, purple Spanish mallow; syn. Malope ciliata F.G. Dietr., Malope grandiflora F.G.Dietr., Malope malacoides var trifida (Cav.) Samp.) is a species of Malope native to the Western Mediterranean Region. This plant is often used as an ornamental plant.

References

Malveae
Flora of Algeria
Flora of Morocco
Flora of Malta
Flora of Spain
Garden plants of Africa
Garden plants of Europe
Taxa named by Antonio José Cavanilles